Ilario Tranquillo (born Pizzo Calabro, Italy) was the author of a book on ancient Napizia, now Pizzo.

References

Italian poets
Italian male poets
18th-century Italian Roman Catholic theologians
People from Pizzo, Calabria